The Northern Ndebele are a Mbo ethnic group native to South Africa who are an offshoot of the Southern Ndebele and they are concentrated in the Limpopo and Northwest provinces of South Africa.

Within the borders of the Republic
of South Africa, there are two ethnolinguistic groups divided into Northern Ndebele and Southern Ndebele who speak different but related Ndebele languages, namely siNdrebele (Northern Ndebele) and isiNdebele (Southern Ndebele).

The Northern Ndebele tribes in South Africa are constituted by Mghumbhani (Mokopane), Mtjhatjhani (Mashashane), Gheghana (Kekana) and Langa (amaNdebele ka Langa), whereas the Southern Ndebele comprise the Ndzundza and Manala tribes.

There is another Northern Ndebele in Zimbabwe known as baka Mthwakazi which is not the same as the Northern Ndebele group from South Africa. The two groups are not related either genealogically or historically, however, the Northern Ndebele and Southern Ndebele of South Africa are related genealogically and historically through being the descendents of the same ancestral king called Musi kaMhlanga.
This Zimbabwean Ndebele group was erroneously classified "Matabele" by colonial history writers and through a combination of misidentifaction, mispronounciation, indifference, and badly written history,  Mzilikazi's subjects ended up being called "Ndebele".

The Northern Ndebele of Zimbabwe speak a Zulu-Ntungwa dialect which they call isiNdebele though the language is not even close to the two Ndebele languages of the Republic of South Africa. The Northern Ndebele of Zimbabwe were historically referred to as the Matabele by Tswana people, for a "Nguni" person. Sotho-Tswana people called all Nguni-speaking people 'Matebele". The difference between the isiNdebele language of Zimbabwe and Zulu language of South Africa is not great. The two languages are mutually intelligible to some degree, with differences in pronunciation, accents, and some loan words. There is also the use of older words in isiNdebele, with some of the words no longer being in use in isiZulu, and only the older generation knows these words. The Northern Ndebele culture and language of Zimbabwe are similar to Zulu culture, as they share ancestry and common origins with Zulu people from the KwaZulu Natal (KZN) province of South Africa. The amaNdebele of Mzilikazi used the much larger cowhide shields and short stabbing assegai of King Shaka's army. Northern Ndebele people of Zimbabwe were also called Bathebele, which became amaNdebele.

The history of the Northern Ndebele of Zimbabwe began when a Nguni group split from King Shaka in the early 19th century under the leadership of Mzilikazi, a former chief in his kingdom and an ally. He was sent to raid cattle up in the North, but changed the plan and continued on to raid the chiefdoms of the Southern Ndebele.

During a turbulent period in Nguni and Sotho-Tswana history, known as the Mfecane or "the crushing" or "the scattering", Mzilikazi's regiment, initially numbering 500 soldiers, moved north to the area that became Transvaal. They moved through areas that included Gauteng, Mpumalanga, North-West, and Limpopo. Mzilikazi was a skilled tactician, both militarily and politically. Mzilikazi attacked or subjugated the local tribes he found along the way, including the Khoi, Batswana, Bapedi, and the real,true and original Ndebele of Mpumalanga. In their land, between 1827 and 1832, Mzilikazi built three military strongholds. The largest was Kungwini, situated at the foot of the Wonderboom Mountains on the Apies River, just north of present-day Pretoria. Another was Dinaneni, north of the Hartbeespoort Dam, while the third was Hlahlandlela in the territory of the Fokeng near Rustenburg. Mzilikazi befriended a white missionary by the name of Robert Moffat. Earlier, he had conquered the BaHurutshe, whose capital Mosega became his military headquarters. He also built his military stronghold at Tshwenyane, Great Marico River, and at eGabeni (Kapain), where he also built a sizeable settlement. When the Voortrekkers in The Great Trek of 1836–1838 arrived in Transvaal, they found Mzilikazi there as the King of the region and he was a threat to their advancement. They fought with him, losing in the first battle but in the second battle in 1837, the Boers led by Potgieter, Maritz, and Uys, launched another attack on Mzilikazi's military stronghold at eGabeni at dawn. In a battle lasting nine days, they destroyed eGabeni as well as other Matabele camps along the Marico River.  Mzilikazi realising that he didn't have a chance against guns, decided to escape with 15,000 of his people, from the Marico valley. Mzilikazi moved to present-day Zimbabwe where the amaNdebele people overwhelmed the indigenous Lozwi which was already crumbling on leadership squabbles after the death of Changamire Dombo, eventually carving out a home. When European people arrived in the area, they found Mzilikazi settled with his people, thus they called the area Matabeleland, which encompassed the west and southwest region of the country. In the course of the migration, large numbers of raided indigenous clans and individuals were absorbed into the Ndebele tribe, adopting the Ndebele language and culture. Historically the assimilated people came from the Southern Ndebele, Swazi, Sotho-Tswana, and Lozwi ethnic groups.

Etymology
They were originally named Matebele in English, a name that is still common in older texts, because that is the name as the British first heard it from the Sotho and Tswana peoples. In the early 19th century, the Ndebele invaded and lived in territories populated by Sotho-Tswana peoples who used the plural prefix "Ma" for certain types of unfamiliar people or the Nguni prefix ama, so the British explorers, who were first informed of the existence of the kingdom by Sotho-Tswana communities they encountered on the trip north, would have been presented with two variations of the name, first, the Sotho-Tswana pronunciation (Matebele) and second, the Ndebele pronunciation (Ndebele or amaNdebele). They are now commonly known as the "Ndebele" or "amaNdebele" (and were officially known as the Matebele when under British rule). Another term for the Ndebele Kingdom is "Mthwakazi" and the people are referred to as "uMthwakazi" or "oMthwakazi".

Early history

The Khumalos were caught between the Ndwandwe led by Zwide and the Zulus led by Shaka. To please the Ndwandwe tribe, the Khumalo chief Mashobane married the daughter of the Ndwandwe chief Zwide and sired a son, Mzilikazi. The Ndwandwes were closely related to the Zulus and spoke the same language, Nguni, using different dialects.

When Mashobane did not tell Zwide about patrolling Mthethwa amabutho (soldiers), Zwide had Mashobana killed. Thus his son, Mzilikazi, became the leader of the Khumalo. Mzilikazi immediately mistrusted his grandfather, Zwide, and took 50 warriors to join Shaka. Shaka was overjoyed because the Khumalos would be useful spies on Zwide and the Ndwandwes. After a few battles, Shaka gave Mzilikazi the extraordinary honour of being chief of the Khumalos and remaining semi-independent from the Zulu, if Zwide could be defeated.

This caused immense jealousy among Shaka's older allies, but as warriors, none realised their equal in Mzilikazi. Mzilikazi collected all intelligence for the defeat of Zwide. Hence, when Zwide was defeated, Shaka rightly acknowledged he could not have done it without Mzilikazi and presented him with an ivory axe. There were only two such axes, one for Shaka and one for Mzilikazi. Shaka himself placed the plumes on Mzilikazi's head after Zwide was vanquished.

The Khumalos returned to peace in their ancestral homeland. This peace lasted until Shaka asked Mzilikazi to punish a tribe to the north of the Khumalo, belonging to one Raninsi a Sotho. After the defeat of Raninsi, Mzilikazi refused to hand over the cattle to Shaka. Shaka, loving Mzilikazi, did nothing about it. But his generals, long disliking Mzilikazi, pressed for action, and thus a first force was sent to teach Mzilikazi a lesson. The force was soundly beaten by Mzilikazi's 500 warriors, compared to the Zulus' 3,000 warriors (though Mzilikazi had the cover of the mountains). This made Mzilikazi the only warrior to have ever defeated King Shaka in battle.

Shaka reluctantly sent his veteran division, the Ufasimbi, to put an end to Mzilikazi and the embarrassing situation. Mzilikazi was left with only 300 warriors who were grossly outnumbered. He was also betrayed by his brother, Zeni, who had wanted Mzilikazi's position for himself. Thus Mzilikazi was defeated. He gathered his people with their possessions and fled north to the hinterland to escape Shaka's reach. After a temporary home was found near modern Pretoria, the Ndebele were defeated by the Boers and compelled to move away to the north of the Limpopo river.

Ndebele Kingdom

Mzilikazi chose a new headquarters on the western edge of the central plateau of modern-day Zimbabwe, leading some 20,000 Ndebele, descendants of the Nguni and Sotho of South Africa. He had invaded the Rozvi state and raided some of the Rozvi people (mostly women). The rest became satellite farming communities and were forced to pay tribute to the Northern Ndebele language Kingdom.

Mzilikazi called his new nation Mthwakazi, a Zulu word which means something which became big at conception, in Zulu "into ethe ithwasa yabankulu." Europeans called the territory "Matebeleland." Mzilikazi organised this ethnically diverse nation into a militaristic system of regimental towns and established his capital at Bulawayo.

In 1852 the Boer government in Transvaal made a treaty with Mzilikazi. Mzilikazi died on 9 September 1868, near Bulawayo. His son, Lobengula, succeeded him as king.

In exchange for wealth and arms, Lobengula granted several concessions to the British, the most prominent of which is the 1888 Rudd concession giving Cecil Rhodes exclusive mineral rights in much of the lands east of his main territory. Gold was already known to exist, so with the Rudd concession, Rhodes was able to obtain a royal charter to form the British South Africa Company (BSAC) in 1889.

Lobengula established a state that held sovereignty over the region between the Limpopo and Zambezi rivers to the north and south, and between the desert of the Makgadikgadi salt pans to the west and the realm of Shoshangana to the east, the Save River. Rhodes negotiated a territorial treaty with Lobengula, known as the Rudd Concession of 1888, which permitted British mining and colonisation of Zimbabwe, and prohibited all Boer settlement in the country. As part of the agreement, the BSAC would pay Lobengula 100 pounds a month, as well as 1,000 rifles, 10,000 rounds of ammunition, and a riverboat. Lobengula had hoped that the Rudd Concession would diminish European incursions, but as white settlers moved in, the British South Africa Company set up its own government, made its own laws, and set its sights on more mineral rights and more territorial concessions.

The social organisation of the Northern Ndebele language people was rigidly controlled by rules of service and hierarchy inherited from Shaka's reforms among the Zulu. Other subject peoples, such as in Mashonaland, were treated harshly; their lives and property were subject to the King's control and could be disrupted at any time by raids or exactions of tribute. This was the scene presented to the British Pioneer Column when they arrived in Mashonaland in 1890.

First Matebele War

In August 1893 Lobengula sent warriors down to Fort Victoria to raid cattle from the Shona people. The armed Lobengula's warriors won and brought back home the cattle. The British South Africa Company took this as a good opportunity to attack King Lobengula in the disguise of protecting the Shona. During this confrontation, a fight broke out between BSAC and Matebele and thus began the First Matebele War. Hoping for a quick victory, Leander Starr Jameson sent his BSAC forces to attack the capital KwaBulawayo and capture Lobengula. But rather than fight, Lobengula burned down his capital and fled with a few of his elite warriors. The BSAC moved into the remains of koBulawayo, establishing a base, which they renamed KwaBulawayo, and then sent out patrols to find Lobengula. The most famous of these patrols, the Shangani Patrol, managed to find Lobengula, only to be trapped and wiped out in battle.

The British were vastly outnumbered throughout the war, but their superior armaments, most notably the Maxim gun, proved to be too much for the Ndebele. In an attempt to reach a peace accord with the British, a band of Lobengula's warriors brought a large sum of gold to two BSAC soldiers to be delivered to their superiors. The two soldiers instead decided to keep the gold for themselves and the incident went undiscovered for many months. Lobengula decided to escape, the last time he was seen crossing the Shangani river.

Second Matebele War

In March 1896 the Matebele revolted against the authority of the British South Africa Company, in what is now celebrated in Mthwakazi as the First War of Independence. After a year of drought and cattle sickness, Mlimo, the Matebele spiritual leader, is credited with fomenting much of the anger that led to this confrontation. An estimated 50,000 Matebele retreated into their stronghold of the Matobo Hills near KwaBulawayo which became the scene of the fiercest fighting against the white settler patrols, led by legendary military figures such as Frederick Russell Burnham, Robert Baden-Powell, and Frederick Selous. Hundreds of white settlers and uncounted Matebele and Mashona were killed over the next year and a half. The Matebele military defiance ended only when Burnham found and assassinated Mlimo. Upon learning of Mlimo's death, Rhodes boldly walked unarmed into the Matebele stronghold and persuaded the leaders to lay down their arms. This final uprising thus ended in October 1897 and Matebeleland and Mashonaland were later renamed Rhodesia.

Umvukela Wesibili

During the Umvukela wesibili, the main rebel group, Zimbabwe African People's Union (ZAPU), split into two groups in 1963, the split-away group renamed itself the Zimbabwe African National Union (ZANU). Though these groups had a common origin they gradually grew apart, with the split away group, ZANU, recruiting mainly from the Shona regions, while ZAPU recruited mainly from Ndebele-speaking regions.

The Zimbabwe People's Revolutionary Army (ZIPRA) was a primarily Ndebele anti-government force, led by Joshua Nkomo, and the ZAPU political organization. Nkomo's ZIPRA trained and planned their missions in Zambian bases. However, this was not always with full Zambian government support. By 1979, the combined forces based in Zambia of ZIPRA, Umkhonto we Sizwe (the armed wing of the African National Congress of South Africa), and the South West Africa People's Organization (SWAPO) fighters was a major threat to Zambia's internal security. Because ZAPU's political strategy relied more heavily on negotiations than armed force, ZIPRA did not grow as quickly or elaborately as the Zimbabwe African National Liberation Army (ZANLA), but by 1979 it had an estimated 20,000 combatants, almost all based in camps around Lusaka, Zambia.

Gukurahundi

The Gukurahundi (Shona: "the early rain which washes away the chaff before the spring rains") refers to the suppression by Zimbabwe's 5th Brigade in the predominantly Ndebele speaking region of Matabeleland, who most of whom were supporters of Joshua Nkomo and ZAPU.

Robert Mugabe, then prime minister, had signed an agreement with North Korean President Kim Il Sung in October 1980 to have the North Korean military train a brigade for the Zimbabwean army. This was soon after Mugabe had announced the need for a militia to "combat malcontents." Mugabe replied by saying Matabeleland dissidents should "watch out," announcing the brigade would be called "Gukurahundi". This brigade was named the Fifth Brigade. The members of the Fifth Brigade were drawn from 3,500 ex-ZANLA troops at Tongogara Assembly Point, named after Josiah Tongogara, the ZANLA general. The training of the Fifth Brigade lasted until September 1982, when Minister Sekeramayi announced training was complete.

The first commander of the Fifth Brigade was Colonel Perrance Shiri. The Fifth Brigade was different from all other Zimbabwean army units in that it was directly subordinate to the prime minister's office, and not integrated into the normal army command structures. Their codes, uniforms, radios, and equipment were not compatible with other army units. Their most distinguishing feature in the field was their red berets.

After several Zipra forces in Lupane and Matopos refused to down their tools, the Fifth Brigade conducted public executions of ex-Zipra soldiers, families, and supporters in Lupane, Tsholotsho and Matopos, Matabeleland. Some victims were often forced to re-initiation camps but those who refused were executed and buried in mass graves. The initial number of executed Ndebeles was 2800 in 1987, however, some recent politicians made estimates of 20 000, with others assuming as much as 100 000. The largest number of dead in a single killing occurred on 5 March 1983, when 62 young men were shot on the banks of the Cewale River, Lupane. Seven survived with gunshot wounds, the other 55 died. Another way the Fifth Brigade used to kill large groups of people was to burn them alive in huts. They did this in Tsholotsho and also in Lupane. They would routinely round up dozens, or even hundreds, of civilians and march them at gunpoint to a central place, such as a school or a borehole. There they would beat the civilians with sticks and force them to sing songs praising ZANU. These gatherings usually ended with public executions. Those killed included civilians perceived as dissidents, ex-ZIPRA guerrillas, and ZAPU officials.

Notable Ndebele

 King Bulelani Khumalo, current Ndebele King
 Khayisa Nhlanhlayamangwe Ndiweni, Chief of the Matebele people of Ntabazinduna and Mbembezi, 1939-2010
 Nhlanhlayamangwe Felix Ndiweni, Chief of the Matebele people of Ntabazinduna and Mbembezi 2010–present
 Mimi. M Khayisa (Mimi Ndiweni), actress
 Dumiso Dabengwa, politician
 Lovemore Majaivana, musician
 Lookout Masuku, leader of ZIPRA
 Alfred Nikita Mangena,first Zipra army commander
 Josiah Gumede, ceremonial president after the last war with the whites
 Mpumelelo Mbangwa, cricketer
 Jonathan Moyo, politician
 Busi Ncube, singer
 Pius Ncube, Archbishop of kwaBulawayo
 Welshman Ncube, politician
 Peter Ndlovu, footballer
 Mluleki Nkala, cricketer
 Joshua Nkomo, late ZAPU leader (politician)
 Albert Nyathi, poet
 Gibson Sibanda, politician
 Jabulani Sibanda, politician
 Thenjiwe Lesabe, teacher, war hero, and political activist.
 Cont Mhlanga, playwright, actor, and theatre director
 Sandra Ndebele, musician
 Albert Nyathi, Poet and musician
 Prince Dube
 Tando Velaphi
 Milton Ncube
 Richard Hachiro

References

Further reading
 Scouting on Two Continents by Major Frederick Russell Burnham, D.S.O. (1926). LC call number: DT775 .B8 1926.
 Migrant Kingdom: Mzilikazi's Ndebele in South Africa by R. Kent Rasmussen (1978).
 Mzilikazi of the Ndebele by R. Kent Rasmussen (1977).
 The Zulus and Matabele, Warrior Nations by Glen Lyndon Dodds, (1998).
 Historical Dictionary of Zimbabwe by Steven C. Rubert and R. Kent Rasmussen (3rd ed., 2001).

External links

 People of Africa

 
 
Zulu topics
Ethnic groups in Zimbabwe